Mark Frank may refer to:

 Mark Frank (athlete) (born 1977), javelin thrower from Germany
 Mark Frank (theologian) (1613–1664), English churchman and academic
 Mark G. Frank (born 1961), social psychologist and communication professor